The Brown Tobacco Warehouse is a historic warehouse building located in Louisville, Kentucky.  The two-story brick structure was built in 1892. It was first occupied by John W. Brown & Brothers Tobacco Company.

It was added to the National Register of Historic Places in 1983.

It has a two-story arched entrance for vehicles, with three narrower round-arched window bays on each side.  The building is "representative of the architecture of the many tobacco warehouses built after the 1890 tornado."

See also
 National Register of Historic Places listings in Portland, Louisville, Kentucky

References

Commercial buildings on the National Register of Historic Places in Kentucky
Commercial buildings completed in 1892
19th-century buildings and structures in Louisville, Kentucky
Commercial buildings in Louisville, Kentucky
1892 establishments in Kentucky
National Register of Historic Places in Louisville, Kentucky
Tobacco buildings in the United States
Warehouses on the National Register of Historic Places